Mary Nightingale (born 26 May 1963) is an English journalist and television presenter, best known for presenting the ITV Evening News since 2001.

Education and early career
Nightingale was educated at St Margaret's School, an independent school for girls, near the Royal Devon and Exeter Hospital in Exeter, Devon, and King Edward VI School in Totnes, Devon. She obtained a BA in English from Bedford College, University of London, now merged with Royal Holloway, University of London.

Nightingale began her career in journalism as a presenter and writer on World Business Satellite for TV Tokyo. She then went on to work for BBC World's World Business Report as a presenter and writer, covering economic and corporate news.

Nightingale also worked for Reuters Financial Television in 1994 as a presenter on the early morning financial programme.

TV career

1990s
She co-presented Carlton Country, a factual series about life in the countryside, as well as presenting the Holiday programme on BBC One. In May 1994, she became the first presenter of After 5 the London News Network early-evening show. In 1991, she worked as co-presenter on ITV's coverage of the Rugby World Cup in Britain, France and Ireland, and in 1995, presented from the following tournament in South Africa on the regular evening highlights programme. In 1996, Nightingale presented BBC Two's Ski Sunday.

Until April 1999, Nightingale was co-presenter with Alastair Stewart of London News Network's flagship news programme London Tonight and was the sole presenter of London Today, Carlton's lunchtime news bulletin. She also presented the daily late news bulletins of London Tonight.

2000s
Nightingale anchored ITV's flagship holiday programme Wish You Were Here...? from 1999–2001, and also presented The Really Good Food Show.

In 2001, Nightingale was promoted to the ITV Evening News and she left her position on London Tonight. She was also part of the ITN team covering the 2001 general election.

In 2002, she broke the news of the death of Queen Elizabeth The Queen Mother.

Nightingale has also fronted various ITV programmes including: Holidays Undercover in 2006, The Girl Who Would Be Queen, and Diana - A Service of Thanksgiving in 2007.

2010s
Nightingale was an occasional presenter of the ITV Lunchtime News and ITV News weekend bulletins, and previously acted as a relief presenter on ITV News at Ten before the programme's restructure in October 2015.

In April 2011, she took over from Mark Nicholas as the host of the ITV daytime cookery programme Britain's Best Dish.

On 23 September 2012, she presented William & Kate: The South Seas Tour on ITV.

On 13 December 2016, it was announced Nightingale would become the sole presenter of the ITV Evening News from January 2017 onwards.

2020s
On 8 September 2022, Nightingale announced on ITV News that Queen Elizabeth II had died.

Awards
In 2002 and 2004, she won TRIC Awards in the category "Newscaster of the Year".

Personal life
Nightingale has been married since April 2000 to television producer Paul Fenwick, the former Human Resource director of Trailfinders.  The couple have two children.

Filmography

References

External links
Official website

1963 births
British television journalists
British television presenters
ITN newsreaders and journalists
ITV regional newsreaders and journalists
Living people
People from Scarborough, North Yorkshire